Constance of France may refer to:

 Constance of France, Princess of Antioch (1078-1125), daughter of Philip I of France
 Constance of France, Countess of Toulouse (1124–1176), daughter of Louis VI of France